Bordeaux is an unincorporated community in Dawes County, Nebraska, United States.

History
Bordeaux took its name from Bordeaux Creek. A post office was established at Bordeaux in 1884, and remained in operation until it was discontinued in 1896.

References

Unincorporated communities in Dawes County, Nebraska
Unincorporated communities in Nebraska